Larry Henry Abraham (October 29, 1937 – July 7, 2008)  was an American businessman and author. He was the co-founder of PanAmerica Capital Group, Inc., and a speaker on political, economic, and financial topics. He was a member of Robert W. Welch, Jr.'s John Birch Society.  He was the co-author with Gary Allen of the 1971 best-seller None Dare Call It Conspiracy, which sold more than five million copies during the 1972 U.S. presidential election.  His obituary says he spent most of his life in the conservative movement.

Selected works
Books
 None Dare Call It Conspiracy, with Gary Allen. Seal Beach, Calif.: Concord Press (1972). Introduction by Congressman John G. Schmitz.
 Call It Conspiracy. Seattle, Wash.: Double A. Publications (1985). Prologue by Gary North, Ph.D. .
 Update to None Dare Call It Conspiracy.
 The Greening: The Environmentalists' Drive for Global Power, with Franklin Sanders. Phoenix, Ariz.: Double A Publications (1993). . .

Book contributions
 Prologue to New Lies for Old: The Communist Strategy for Deception and Disinformation, by Anatoliy Golitsyn. New York: Dodd, Mead (1985), pp. iv-xvi. .

Newsletters
 The G.E.O. Report
 Larry Abraham's Insider Report

Filmography
 Countdown to the New World Order (1990).
 Interview with Wallis W. Wood.

References

External links
 
 
 Obituary
 PanAmerica Capital Group website bio

2008 deaths
1939 births
John Birch Society members
American political philosophers